Sayfol International School is an international school located next to Jalan Ampang, Ampang, Kuala Lumpur, Malaysia. It was founded in 1985 by Datuk Seri Haji Ghulam Mohammed Sayeed. Sayfol has approximately 1200 students in the upcoming Academic Year 2020/2021.

External links

References 

International schools in Malaysia
Schools in Kuala Lumpur
Schools in Sabah
Educational institutions established in 1985
1985 establishments in Malaysia
Cambridge schools in Malaysia